Asaveerankudikkadu is a village in the Sendurai taluk of Ariyalur district, Tamil Nadu, India.

Demographics 
As per the 2011 census, Asaveerankudikkadu had a total population of 3981 with 1988 males and 1993 females.

References 

Villages in Ariyalur district